Echols is an unincorporated community in Long Lake Township, Watonwan County, Minnesota, United States.

Notes

Unincorporated communities in Watonwan County, Minnesota
Unincorporated communities in Minnesota